For the Marxist politician and theorist, see Abdullah Badheeb.

Sheikh Abdullah Ibn Umar Badheeb Al Yamani was an eminent Islamic scholar and Sufi from Hadramout, Yemen. He arrived in Sri Lanka in 1858, and until his death he did many works for Sri Lankan Muslims. Sheikh Umar Badheeb was one of the significant figures among Sri Lankan Muslim leaders and reformers in the 19th century. He contributed significantly to Sri Lankan Muslim education along with M.C. Siddi Lebbe and Orabi Pasha. Sheikh Umar Badheeb also provided spiritual guidance, was the Sufi sheikh and founder of Qadiriyatul Badheebiyya Sufi order.

Early life and education 
Sheikh Abdullah Umar Badheeb Al Yamani was born Mocha, Yemen. He gained primary education in his home town. He went to Mecca to study. Sheikh Umar Badheeb studied Islamic sciences and the Arabic language under Sheikh Usman Mirghani Makki in the Grand Mosque of Mecca. He also taken Sufism of sheikh Usman Mirghani Makki and later Sheikh Umar Badheeb traveled to Egypt and He Studied Fiqh, Tafseer, Arabic Grammar and literacy in Al-Azhar University. When he studies in Al-Azhar, He got opportunity to study under Sheikh ul Azhar Ibrahim al-Bajuri.

Later life 
Sheikh Badheeb was Complete His Graduate Study in Al-Azhar University and He traveled to India from Egypt along with Sheikh Assayed Ahmed Ibn Mubarak for dahwah or teaching Islam for Muslim in there. In India Both they travelled to Malabar, Kerala to Visit Sheikh Abdul Rahman. They stayed some days in Sheikh Abdul Rahman house and started their dahwah. After Many days ago Sheikh Badheeb travelled to North India and Sheikh Assayed Ahmed Ibn Mubarak travelled to Sri Lanka. During his Indian visit he wrote his experiences in books. At that time some people campaigned against Muhammad's parents states. Sheikh Badheeb denied that allegation and wrote a book against their allegation under the title of ‘Zuhbathul Muslimeen Bi Abawai Seyyidil Mursaleen’. Later Sheikh Badheeb travelled to Sri Lanka.

Sheikh Badheeb Arrived in Sri Lanka in 1840 after short stay, he returned to Yemen. He arrived Sri Lanka again 1858. When he come to Sri Lanka. Sri Lanka was ruled by the United Kingdom. At that time Sri Lankan Muslims had low levels of education. The Egyptian revolutionary leader Orabi Basha Also arrived Sri Lanka in the same time Sheikh Badheeb arrived. Orabi Pasha and Sheikh Badheeb Arrivals were assisted by M.C. Siddi Lebbe to carry out Sri Lankan education revival among Sri Lankan Muslims. Sheikh Badheeb became Sufi Sheikh of M.C. Siddi Lebbe. M.C. Siddi Lebbe found the Colombo Zahira College with the help of Sheikh Badheeb, Orabi Basha, Wappachhi Marikkar and others. Sheikh Badheeb also helped M.C. Siddi Lebbe to open many schools in many places around Sri Lanka. In this period when Muslims scholars made efforts at spiritual revival, Sheikh Badheeb was a great Sufi sheikh who helped develop the Qadiriyya Sufi order in Sri Lanka.

Sheikh Badheeb travelled to many places in Sri Lanka such as Mawanella, Madulbowa, Hemmathagama, Kandy, Gampola. Sheikh Badheeb stayed in Hemmathagama for some years and brought people toward the right path. He established a takkiyathere. Sheikh Badheeb also found a school in Madulbowa, Today it’s called as Madulbowa Badheebiyya Maha Vidiyalaya. Sheikh Badheeb later came to Kahatowita and stayed there until his death Sheikh Badeeb built a takkiya near Kahatowita Grand Mosque. He guided people toward the right path with spiritual practices. Sheikh Badheeb founded the Badheebiyyatul Qadiriyya Sufi Order. He formed Rathib Majlish and Zikr Majlish. He also founded the annual feast commemoration. Sheikh Badeebh established the school in Baheebiyya Takkiya, Later it was moved to another location. Today this school is known as Kahatowita Al-Badriya Maha Vidiyalaya.

Death
Sheikh Badheeb did many services for Sri Lankan Muslims. He lived in Kahatowita in his last years. Sheikh Badheeb died on 14 January 1892 in kahatowita. He was buried in Kahatowita Badeebiyya takkiya.

Works
Sheikh Badeeb was the prolific writer and he has written many books on various topics.
 Sailul Warid
This book was mainly directed against the distorted ideas and wrongful practices that had crept into the Muslim society in the name of Islam.

Risaltul Atkaar
Riyaalul Ginaan
Nassemun Najdi Bi raddi nunkiril Mahdi
Soorul Mukarrabeen Bi raddil manjoobeen

See also
Qadiriyya
Sufism
Sri Lankan Moors
Al-Azhar University
Zahira College
Sufi

References

External sources

 Gampaha District Muslims History (Sri Lankan Muslim Cultural Department Publication) 

Muslim Personalities in Sri Lanka, then and now.

External links
Badheebiyya Association
Ahamed Orabi Pasha
Landmarks In The History Of The Muslims Of Sri Lanka

Scholars of Sufism
Yemeni Sufis
19th-century Muslim scholars of Islam
1892 deaths
Sri Lankan Sufis
Hadhrami people
1814 births
Sri Lankan people of Yemeni descent